Holly Knight (born September 21, 1956) is an American songwriter, musician, and singer. She was a member of the 1980s pop rock groups Spider and Device, and wrote or co-wrote several hit singles for other artists, such as "Rag Doll", "Obsession", "Love Is a Battlefield", "The Best", "Invincible", "Better Be Good to Me", "The Warrior", and "Change".

In 2013, she was inducted into the Songwriters Hall of Fame. She has won thirteen ASCAP Awards, and has co-written hits for numerous successful musicians, including Tina Turner and Pat Benatar who each won Grammy Awards for their recordings of her songs.

Early life and education
Knight was born in New York City. She started playing classical piano at the age of four, continuing her studies for ten years at the Mannes School of Music.

Career

In 1980, her first big break came when she played keyboards (uncredited) on Kiss' Unmasked album. In the early 1980s, she joined Spider (featuring Anton Fig of Late Show with David Letterman) and her band, managed by Bill Aucoin, manager of Kiss and Billy Idol, among others, got a recording contract with Dreamland Records, an RSO-distributed label, and released two albums: Spider (self-titled; 1980) and Between the Lines (1981).

Knight was already planning to leave Spider, when Dreamland president, songwriter and record producer Mike Chapman urged her to move to Los Angeles to pursue her songwriting career. She signed a publishing deal with his company, eventually signing to EMI Publishing. Knight and Chapman worked together on the top 5 U.S. hit "Better Be Good to Me" (1984) by Tina Turner and "Love Is a Battlefield" (1983) by Pat Benatar, each of which won a Grammy Award for Best Female Rock Vocal Performance. Knight was replaced on keyboards in Spider, later renamed Shanghai for its eponymous and final album, by famed producer Beau Hill, before her former band folded in 1984.

Knight has written hits for some of the most successful artists in music. For Pat Benatar, in addition to "Love Is a Battlefield", she wrote "Invincible"; she co-wrote "The Best", performed by Bonnie Tyler and later a No. 1 single around the world for Tina Turner. On her own and in collaboration with others, Knight wrote songs with Heart, Aerosmith, Rod Stewart, Bon Jovi, and many more. Tina Turner has recorded nine of her tunes, including "The Best", "Better Be Good to Me", and "In Your Wildest Dreams" (1996). She was voted the Best Songwriter in Rolling Stone magazine's 11th annual poll, along with Phil Collins, Paul Simon, Billy Joel, and Bruce Springsteen.

Knight had a second band called Device in the mid-1980s, who had a hit with "Hanging on a Heart Attack" from their lone album 22B3 (1986). Spider and Device both had Top 40 hits, while Device was on MTV's heavy-rotation playlist for four consecutive months. Knight also released a self-titled solo album in 1988. This album featured her own rendition of the song she co-wrote, "Love Is a Battlefield", as well as the single "Heart Don't Fail Me Now", which featured background vocals from Daryl Hall.

Her songs have featured on the soundtracks of numerous films, including Thelma & Louise (1991), Vision Quest (1985), Legend of Billie Jean (1985), Mad Max Beyond Thunderdome (1985), The Secret of My Success (1987), Stuart Little II (2002), 13 Going on 30 (2004), What the Bleep Do We Know!? (2004), and hit television shows such as Nip/Tuck (2003–2010), The Singing Bee (2007–), American Idol, The Oprah Winfrey Show, The Simpsons, Family Guy, 30 Rock, South Park, Dallas Buyers Club, Glee, The Tonight Show Starring Jimmy Fallon, Necessary Roughness, the 40th anniversary Saturday Night Live, and the finale episode of The Voice (2011), in which Cee Lo Green performed a duet of "Love Is a Battlefield" with one of the final contestants. Most recently her songs have been featured in the Netflix hit show, GLOW ("The Warrior"- theme song), Stranger Things, Mixed-ish, The Masked Singer, and Schitt's Creek.

Knight wrote the theme song for the popular Joss Whedon television show Angel (1999–2004), performed by Darling Violetta. She also wrote and produced the title theme for the sitcom Still Standing (2002–2006), performed by Will Hoge, which received the ASCAP award for recognition as one of the top TV music themes of 2003, as well as the same award again in 2004.

In 1988, Knight was listed in the "Best Songwriter Category/Readers Poll" of Rolling Stone along with Bruce Springsteen, Phil Collins, Paul Simon, and Billy Joel.

In the 21st century, Knight has also been active as a record producer. In 2009, she produced a jazz EP called Natural for Antonia Bennett, daughter of Tony Bennett, and in 2012, an alternative pop record of original songs for her, titled Ordinary Girl. In 2014, she produced a second full-length jazz record for Antonia Bennett of songs from the Great American Songbook called Embrace Me, on Perseverance records. She has also produced tracks for Otep, Fefe Dobson, The Donnas, the Australian band Porcelain, and 2014 Tony Award winner Lena Hall.

Knight has been mentioned in several autobiographical books, I Tina by Tina Turner (1986), Between a Rock and a Hard Place by Pat Benatar (2010), Kicking and Screaming by Ann and Nancy Wilson (of Heart; 2013), I'm with The Band by Pamela Des Barres (2005), My Love Story by Tina Turner (2018), and All I Ever Wanted by Kathy Valentine (2020),

In 2017, she contributed a chapter to the book Because I Was a Girl, published by Holt.

Her song, "The Best" has appeared in three episodes of the Netflix Emmy award-winning show, Schitt's Creek season four, episode one - "The Olive Branch" where David lip-synched to the original Tina Turner recording; season four, episode six: "Open Mic", where actor Noah Reid performed an acoustic version of the song; The finale of the series, season six, episode 13, performed by an a cappella group, The Jazz Girls - where David and Patrick get married. This final episode caused "The Best" to become a popular wedding song with the LGBT community.

Three of Knight's songs, "The Best", "Better Be Good to Me", and "Be Tender with Me Baby" appear in the theater production of The Tina Turner Musical, which began previews at the Aldwych Theatre in The West End in London, on March 21, 2018, and officially opened on April 17. In November 2019, the musical made its Broadway debut at the Lunt-Fontanne Theatre in New York. Both premieres saw the attendance of Tina Turner. In March 2019, the show opened at the Stage Operettenhaus in Hamburg, and on February 9, 2020, the show opened at the Beatrix Theater in Utrecht, the Netherlands. Knight is also an investor in the Broadway production. In 2020, the musical won eleven Tony Awards.

"The Best" was featured at the end of Joe Biden's victory speech for his election to the presidency of the United States in 2021.

Holly Knight has released her memoir, I Am the Warrior, published by Simon & Schuster, in November 2022. She also does fine art photography.

Personal life
Knight has two grown sons and lives in Los Angeles.

She has been married twice, and dated Anton Fig and Paul Stanley in the 1980s.

Discography

Studio albums
 Holly Knight (1989)

With Spider
 Spider (1980)
 Between the Lines (1981)

With Device
 22B3 (1986)

Soundtrack appearances
"One of the Living"  (from Mad Max Beyond Thunderdome) (1985)
"Invincible"  (from The Legend of Billie Jean) (1985)
"Love Is a Battlefield"  (from Weird Science) (1985)
"Change"  ( Vision Quest) (1985)
"Love Touch"  (from Legal Eagles) (1986)
"Sometimes the Good Guys Finish First"  (from The Secret of My Success) (
"I Burn for You"  (from The Secret of My Success) 
"I Can't Untie You from Me"  (from Thelma and Louise) 
"Don't Look Back"  (from Thelma and Louise) 
"Better Be Good to Me"  (from Miami Vice episode "Give a Little, Take a Little") 
"Love Is a Battlefield"  (from Small Soldiers) 
"Hold On to the Good Things"  (from Stuart Little 2) 
"Love Is a Battlefield"  (from 13 Going on 30) 
"Obsession"  (from What the Bleep Do We Know!?) ("Obsession"  (from Hot Tub Time Machine) 
"Change"  (from Anchorman 2) "Love Is a Battlefield"  (from The Other Woman) 
"The Warrior"  (from Just Before I Go) 

Songs in theater productionsThe Tina Turner Musical; Moulin RougeSongs (credited as songwriter)
 Ace Frehley - "Hide Your Heart"
 Aerosmith - "Rag Doll"
 Angel (TV series) - theme music 
 Animotion - "Obsession"; "I Engineer"
 Jimmy Barnes - "Between Two Fires"
 Tina Turner -"The Best"; "Better Be Good to Me"; "One of the Living"; "You Can't Stop Me Loving You"; "Be Tender with Me Baby"; "Ask Me How I Feel"; "Love Thing"; "In Your Wildest Dreams"; "Do Something"
 John Waite - "Change"
 Pat Benatar - "Love Is a Battlefield"; "Invincible"; "Sometimes the Good Guys Finish First"; "Girl"
 Patty Smyth - "The Warrior"; "Hands Tied"
 Bon Jovi - "Stick to Your Guns"
 Bonnie Tyler - "Hide Your Heart"; "The Best"; "Where Were You"
 Cheap Trick - "Space"
 Shawn Colvin - "Hold on to the Good Things"
 Darling Violetta - "My Sanctuary" (theme to TV show Angel)
 Device - "Hanging on a Heart Attack"; "Who Says"; "Didn't I Read You Right"; "Sand Stone Cobwebs and Dust"; "Who's on the Line"; "Tough and Tender"; "Pieces on the Ground"; "Fall Apart Golden Heart"; "When Love Is Good"
 Divinyls - "Pleasure and Pain"
 Fefe Dobson - "Get Over Me"
 The Donnas - "Wasted", "Here for the Party"
 Eighth Wonder - "When the Phone Stops Ringing"
 Elvira - "Here Comes the Bride (of Frankenstein)"; "Haunted House"
 Agnetha Fältskog (ABBA) - "Wrap Your Arms Around Me"
 Lita Ford - "Stiletto"
 Lou Gramm - "Just Between You and Me"
 Hall & Oates - "Soul Love"
 Lisa Hartman - "New Romance (It's a Mystery)"
 Heart - "Never"; "All Eyes"; "There's the Girl"; "Tall, Dark Handsome Stranger"; "I Love You"
 Grayson Hugh, Thelma & Louise soundtrack - "Can't Untie You from Me"; "Don't Look Back"; "Road to Freedom"
 Chaka Khan - "Baby Me"
 Kidd Video - "When the Phone Stops Ringing"
 Kids Incorporated - "Change"
 Kiss - "Hide Your Heart"; "I Pledge Allegiance to the State of Rock & Roll"; "Raise Your Glasses"
 Holly Knight - "Heart Don't Fail Me Now"; "Howling at the Moon"; "Love Is a Battlefield"; "Sexy Boy"; "Nature of the Beast" "Palace of Pleasure"; "Howling At The Moon"; "It's Only Me"; "Why Don't You Love Me Like You Used To"
 Less Than Jake - "Overrated (Everything Is)"
 Luke Evans - "Love Is a Battlefield"
 Marilyn Martin - "Turn It On"
 Noah Reid - "The Best"
 Christopher Max - "I Burn for You"
 Suzie McNeil - "Help Me Out"
 Meat Loaf - "Monstro"; "Alive"
 Leigh Nash - "Angel Tonight"
 Hawk Nelson - "Not the Same"
 Aaron Neville - "Try a Little Harder"
 Otep - "Perfectly Flawed", "Ur a Wmn Now"
 Ozzy Osbourne - "Slow Burn"
 Suzi Quatro - "Fear of the Unknown", "Whatever Love Is"
 Real Life - "Babies"
 Riff - "My Heart is Failing Me"
 Robin Beck - "Hide Your Heart"
 Scandal featuring Patty Smyth - "The Warrior"; "Hands Tied"
 Sheila - "Little Darlin'"
 Charlie Sexton - "Space"
 Spider - "Better Be Good to Me"; "New Romance (It's a Mystery)"; "Change"; "Everything Is Alright"; "Little Darlin"; "Go and Run"; "It Didn't Take Long"; "Can't Live This Way Anymore"
 Dusty Springfield - "Time Waits for No One"
 Paul Stanley - "It's Not Me"
 Rod Stewart - "Love Touch"
 Still Standing (TV series) - "Still Standing"
 Rachel Sweet - "Little Darlin'"
 Kim Wilde - "Turn It On"
 Zander Bleck - "Temptation"

References

External links

 Holly Knight official site
 
 Holly Knight interview with Carl Wiser, Songfacts''; accessed June 9, 2014.
 Holly Knight in the Songwriters Hall of Fame

Living people
Singers from New York City
Songwriters from New York (state)
Mannes School of Music alumni
American women pop singers
American women songwriters
American pop keyboardists
American rock keyboardists
American pop rock musicians
Record producers from New York (state)
American women record producers
20th-century American keyboardists
Women keyboardists
20th-century American women musicians
21st-century American women
1956 births